The National Archives of the Bahamas are located in Nassau. The archives (also known as The Department of Archives, Commonwealth of The Bahamas) were established in 1971.

The director is Patrice M. Williams.

See also 

 List of national archives

References

External links 

 http://www.bahamasnationalarchives.bs/

Bahamas
Archives in the Bahamas